Abdon Alinovi (6 May 1923 – 15 February 2018) was an Italian politician.

Alinovi was born in Eboli on 6 May 1923. He moved to Naples and became active in the Italian Communist Party. In 1976, Alinovi sat in the Chamber of Deputies, representing Naples until 1992. He later joined the Democrats of the Left and served as the party's Naples chapter president.

Alinovi died in Naples at the age of 94 on 15 February 2018.

References

1923 births
2018 deaths
People from Eboli
Italian Communist Party politicians
Democratic Party of the Left politicians
Democrats of the Left politicians
Deputies of Legislature VII of Italy
Deputies of Legislature VIII of Italy
Deputies of Legislature IX of Italy
Deputies of Legislature X of Italy
Politicians from Naples